Aquilegia fragrans, the fragrant columbine or sweet-scented columbine, is a species of columbine belonging to the family Ranunculaceae.

Distribution and habitat
This species is native to sub-alpine meadows in Western Himalayas, at altitudes of 2400–3600 m. It is present in  Afghanistan, Jammu and Kashmir, India, Pakistan and Pakistani Kashmir.

Description
This herbaceous perennial plant has fern-like foliage and showy, fragrant, creamy yellow and white flowers. Sepals are pale yellow/cream, while the white petals may be lightly tinged with blue. It blooms from June to August.

References

fragrans